Freedom Riders is a 2010 American historical documentary film, produced by Firelight Media for PBS American Experience. The film is based in part on the book Freedom Riders: 1961 and the Struggle for Racial Justice by historian Raymond Arsenault. Directed by Stanley Nelson, it marked the 50th anniversary of the first Freedom Ride in May 1961 and first aired on May 16, 2011. It was funded in part by the National Endowment for the Humanities. The film was also featured on The Oprah Winfrey Show program titled, Freedom Riders: 50th Anniversary. Nelson was helped in the making of the documentary by Arsenault and Derek Catsam, an associate professor at the University of Texas of the Permian Basin.

In 2020, the film was selected for preservation in the United States National Film Registry by the Library of Congress as being "culturally, historically, or aesthetically significant", making it the seventh film designated in its first year of eligibility, the first in the 2010s, and the most recently released film to be selected until 2011's Pariah was inducted in 2022.

Summary
The film chronicles the story behind hundreds of civil rights activists called Freedom Riders that challenged racial segregation in American interstate transportation during the Civil Rights Movement. The activist traveled together in small interracial groups and sat wherever they chose on buses and trains to compel equal access to terminal restaurants and waiting rooms.  They brought the ongoing practice of racial segregation in the southern United States to national attention.

Reception and legacy
Freedom Riders has received generally positive reviews from television critics and parents of young children. Michael Sragow of The Baltimore Sun wrote, "One of the great social epics of our time."

In 2020, the film was selected for preservation in the United States National Film Registry by the Library of Congress as being "culturally, historically, or aesthetically significant". It is the first in the 2010s to be put in the registry.

Awards
 2010: Official Selection, Full Frame Documentary Film Festival
 2010: Official Selection, Maryland Film Festival
 2010: Official Selection, Silverdocs Documentary Film Festival
 2010: Official Selection, Sundance Film Festival
 2011: Heartland Film Festival: Best Documentary Feature
 2011: Japan Prize: Welfare Category
 2012: Primetime Emmy Award: Exceptional Merit in Nonfiction Filmmaking
 2012: Primetime Emmy Award: Outstanding Picture Editing for Nonfiction Programming
 2012: Primetime Emmy Award: Outstanding Writing for Nonfiction Programming
 2012: Eddie Award: Best Edited Documentary
 2012: Writers Guild of America Award: Best Documentary Screenplay: Nominated

See also
 Civil rights movement in popular culture
 Freedom Riders National Monument

Further reading
 
 Catsam, Derek Charles. Freedom's Main Line: The Journey of Reconciliation and the Freedom Rides, 2009 University Press of Kentucky.

References

External links
 Freedom Riders - Firelight Media
 American Experience: Freedom Riders
 

2010 films
2010 documentary films
American documentary films
Documentaries about racism
Documentary films about the civil rights movement
Films set in 1961
American Experience
Films directed by Stanley Nelson Jr.
Freedom Riders
United States National Film Registry films
Films set in the 1960s
Films based on non-fiction books
Primetime Emmy Award-winning broadcasts
2010s English-language films
2010s American films